Bohr (also known as Bār) is a village in Shabankareh Rural District, Shabankareh District, Dashtestan County, Bushehr Province, Iran. At the 2006 census, its population was 278, in 55 families.

References 

Populated places in Dashtestan County